Cissy Dionizia Namujju (born 15 July 1977) is a Ugandan legislator, and an ICT Expert. As of March 2021, she serves as the elected woman representative for Lwengo District in Uganda's eleventh parliament. Politically, she is affiliated to the National Resistance Movement under whose ticket she contested in the 2021 general election. Cissy has also served in Uganda's tenth Parliament under the same political party.

Education 
Cissy Dionizia Namujju attained the Uganda Certificate of Education (UCE) in 2005 and the Uganda Advanced Certificate of Education (UACE) in 2007 from Modern Secondary School. She holds Diploma in Information Systems Management from APTECH (2010).

Career 
Cissy Namujju was a supervisor at AGOA Girls (2002-2003) before serving as a political mobilizer for the State House (2003 - 2015). Since 2016 to date she has been a member of parliament. In Uganda's tenth Parliament, she serves on the Foreign Affairs Committee and the Science and Technology Committee.

Personal life 
She is single. Her hobbies are Sports and, Reading. Cissy's interests are Caring for The Elderly, Widows and Orphans, Promoting Modern Farming and Community Sensitization.

See also 

 National Resistance Movement
 Member of parliament
 Lwengo District
 Parliament of Uganda
List of members of the tenth Parliament of Uganda

References

External links 
 Website of the Parliament of Uganda
 MP who couldn’t answer P3 questions thrown out of office

1977 births
Living people
Members of the Parliament of Uganda
Women members of the Parliament of Uganda
National Resistance Movement politicians
People from Lwengo District
21st-century Ugandan politicians
21st-century Ugandan women politicians